The Department of Communications was an Australian government department that existed between December 1993 and January 1994.

Scope
Information about the department's functions and/or government funding allocation could be found in the Administrative Arrangements Orders, the annual Portfolio Budget Statements and in the Department's annual reports.

At its creation, the Department was responsible for:
Postal and telecommunications services 
Management of the electromagnetic spectrum 
Broadcasting services.

Structure
The Department was an Australian Public Service department, staffed by officials who were responsible to the Minister for Communications, Michael Lee. The Secretary of the Department was Neville Stevens.

References

Ministries established in 1993
Communications